YTH domain family, member 1 is a protein that in humans is encoded by the YTHDF1 gene.

See also 
N6-Methyladenosine

References

Further reading

External links 
 PDBe-KB provides an overview of all the structure information available in the PDB for Human YTH domain-containing family protein 1 (YTHDF1)

Genes on human chromosome 20